Hakkengū (Japanese: 八剣宮) is a Shinto shrine established in 708 located in Atsuta-ku, Nagoya, Aichi Prefecture, in Japan. It is the betsugū (auxiliary shrine) of the Atsuta Shrine. The legendary sword Kusanagi no Tsurugi, one of the three Imperial Regalia of Japan, is worshipped as the shintai of the shrine.

History 
Hakkengū was established in 708. From the architectural style to the annual festivals and rituals, everything is done according to Atsuta Shrine's hongū (main shrine). Since ancient times, the samurai have been deeply worshipped.

In 1575, Oda Nobunaga and his eldest son Kankurō encamped in Atsuta during the Battle of Nagashino. Observing that Hakkengū had deteriorated to the point that it had lost its essential character, Nobunaga ordered the shrine to be repaired by his chief carpenter Okabe Mataemon.

In 1599, shōgun Tokugawa Ieyasu repaired the haiden (hall of worship) and the shrine corridors and walls. In 1686, shōgun Tokugawa Tsunayoshi rebuilt the main shrine.

Deities 
6 deities are worshipped at the Hakkengū shrine.

 Atsuta no Ōkami
 Amaterasu Ōmikami
 Susanoo no Mikoto
 Yamato Takeru no Mikoto
 Miyazuhime no Mikoto
 Takeinadane no Mikoto

References 

Shinto shrines in Nagoya
708 establishments
Buildings and structures in Nagoya